Julián Casanova may refer to:

 Julián Casanova Ruiz (born 1956), Spanish historian
 Julián Casanova (ski mountaineer) (born 1984), Argentine ski mountaineer and mountain climber